Charles Lee Underhill (July 20, 1867 – January 28, 1946) was a United States representative and anti-suffrage activist from Massachusetts. He was born in Richmond, Virginia on July 20, 1867. He moved to Massachusetts in 1872 with his parents, who settled in Somerville.  He attended the common schools, was office boy, coal teamster, and a blacksmith. He subsequently engaged in the manufacture and sale of hardware in that city.

Underhill served in the Massachusetts House of Representatives (1902-1903 and 1908-1913), and was a member of the State constitutional convention in 1917 and 1918. 

Underhill was opposed to women voting. He was a state delegate of the Men's Association Opposed to Woman Suffrage to Washington DC in 1913.

He was elected as a Republican to the Sixty-seventh and to the five succeeding Congresses (March 4, 1921 – March 3, 1933).  He was chairman  of Committee on Claims (Sixty-ninth and Seventieth Congresses) and the Committee on Accounts (Seventy-first Congress).  He was not a candidate for renomination to the Seventy-third Congress.  He then engaged in real estate development in Washington, D.C. from 1933 until he retired in 1941.  Underhill died in New York City on January 28, 1946.  His interment was in Mount Auburn Cemetery in Cambridge, Massachusetts.

See also
 1918 Massachusetts legislature
 1919 Massachusetts legislature

References

External links

1867 births
1946 deaths
Republican Party members of the Massachusetts House of Representatives
Members of the 1917 Massachusetts Constitutional Convention
Burials at Mount Auburn Cemetery
Republican Party members of the United States House of Representatives from Massachusetts